Colin Geoffrey Bell (born April 20, 1981) is an American Democratic Party politician who served in the New Jersey Senate, representing the 2nd Legislative District, from October 5, 2017, to January 9, 2018. Bell was selected to fill the seat of fellow Democrat Jim Whelan following Whelan's death; Bell subsequently lost his 2017 general election bid to Republican Chris A. Brown. Prior to his tenure in the New Jersey Senate, Bell was an Atlantic County Freeholder from 2013 to 2015.

Education and legal career
Bell grew up in Hamilton Township, Atlantic County, New Jersey and graduated from Oakcrest High School. He earned a B.A. in political science at American University and was awarded a J.D. from Washington College of Law. From 2006 to 2008, Bell was an Assistant Atlantic County Prosecutor. He works as an attorney dealing with construction-related litigation.

Political career

Atlantic County Freeholder
Bell ran for one of two at-large seats on the Atlantic County Board of Chosen Freeholders in 2011 and came in fourth, behind Republicans John Risley and Alex Marino, as well as incumbent Democrat Jim Schroeder, who lost his seat on the board. He ran again in 2012 and won the one open at-large seat on the board, where he served a single three-year term of office. Bell knocked off two-term incumbent Republican Frank Giordano by a 52,632 to 48,828 margin to become the board's second Democrat. On the freeholder board, Bell supported programs to increase openness and fiscal responsibility, help the area recover from Hurricane Sandy and to assist veterans find homes and jobs.

New Jersey Legislature
In 2015, Bell ran for the New Jersey General Assembly in the 2nd District and came in third behind the two incumbents, Republican Chris A. Brown and Democrat Vince Mazzeo, as neither incumbent was able to get his running mate elected despite heavy spending on both sides.

Bell was unanimously selected on September 5, 2017, by the Democratic county committee to fill the remainder of Whelan's senate term following Whelan's death on August 22. He was sworn into office on October 5.

A resident of Margate City, Bell had originally planned to run for Assembly in 2017, with Mazzeo running for Whelan's Senate seat. After Mazzeo's father died, Mazzeo decided to run for re-election to his Assembly seat and Bell ran unopposed in the Democratic primary for the vacant Senate seat.

In one of the most expensive of the 120 legislative races in the 2017 general election, in which $4.6 million was spent, Republican Chris A. Brown defeated Bell by a 54%–46% margin, taking a Senate seat that had been held by Democrats since 2008 and giving the Republicans their only Senate seat that changed parties, in an election that had many major victories for the Democratic Party across the state.

References

External links
New Jersey Legislature financial disclosure forms – 2016

1981 births
Living people
American University alumni
Washington College of Law alumni
Democratic Party New Jersey state senators
County commissioners in New Jersey
New Jersey lawyers
Oakcrest High School alumni
People from Hamilton Township, Atlantic County, New Jersey
People from Margate City, New Jersey
Politicians from Atlantic County, New Jersey
21st-century American politicians